The Barry Point Fire was a wildfire that burned over  of Oregon and California forest land during the summer of 2012.  The fire began on 5 August 2012, the result of a lightning strike. The fire consumed public forest and rangeland as well as private forest and grazing land located in Lake County, Oregon and Modoc County, California.  The public lands effected by the fire are administered by the United States Forest Service and the Oregon Department of Forestry.  The largest part of the private land was owned by the Collins Timber Company.  At the peak of the firefighting effort, there were 1,423 personnel working on the fire.  It took 22 days to fully contain the fire and then an additional three weeks to mop it up.

Origin 

On 5 August 2012, a thunderstorm passed over southern Oregon and northern California. The storm produced a number of lightning strikes in the Fremont-Winema National Forest. Unfortunately, the storm did not deliver any rain with the lightning. The Forest Service named it the Barry Point Fire.

A combination of hot dry weather and gusty winds had created dangerous fire conditions in the Fremont-Winema National Forest.  Around Barry Point, the fire conditions were exacerbated by heavy forest ground cover and the general inaccessibility of the area.  By mid-morning these conditions had produced a high intensity fire with large trees torching off in rapid succession and numerous spot fires spreading the blaze rapidly.  The prevailing winds initially drove the fire toward the northeast.  However, the wind then shifted unexpectedly, pushing the fire southward.  Firefighters battled the blaze for over three weeks as it consumed large tracts of public forest and rangeland along with private forest and ranch grazing lands.

Chronology 

 In the late afternoon on 5 August 2012, a lightning strike ignited a wildfire near Barry Point on the Fremont-Winema National Forest in southern Lake County, Oregon.
 On 6 August 2012, the lookout at Dog Mountain reported the Barry Point Fire to the Lakeview Interagency Fire Center in the late afternoon. At the time, there were already five other fires burning in the general area, and there were more fires in other parts of the Fremont-Winema National Forest and on nearby state forest lands. A few minutes later, the lookout reported that the fire had doubled in size and was growing rapidly due to gusty winds in the area. In the meantime, the interagency fire center dispatched ground crews and a helicopter to fight the fire. Within a half-hour, the lookout reported a new spot fire west of the main blaze. The helicopter also reported more spot fire up to  ahead of the main fire. Based on that report, the fire center requested air tanker support. There were no large air tankers available, but two smaller retardant planes were dispatched. The air tankers made several drops, but had to retire at dusk. The ground attack continued through the night with hand crews, pumper engines, and bulldozers.
 The next morning, 7 August, fire managers held over the night crews to continue fighting the fire. Additional crews also arrived on scene. The two small retardant planes returned along with helicopter support. Three large air tankers were also assigned to the fire. These air assets were used throughout the day. Nevertheless, the fire continued to expand rapidly with numerous spot fires making line building very difficult. In mid-afternoon, an expanded fire management team was ordered. By late afternoon, the fire was reported to be  and still growing. Late that night, crews began a burnout operation to prevent the fire from spread to the south.
 On the morning of 8 August, fire managers believed the burnout operation conducted during the night had been successful.  Air operations were hindered in the morning by bad visibility and aircraft mechanical problems.  In the afternoon, air support was resumed.  All day, ground crews built fire line.  Additional burnout operations were conducted by the day shift crews and were continued by the night shift.  This stopped the fire's spread to the north, but was unsuccessful in preventing the fire from spreading up the western slope of Dog Mountain.

 Early on 9 August, the fire was reported to be , but it was only 25 percent contained. Command of the fire suppression operation was transitioned to an expanded Oregon Interagency Incident Management Team. In addition the Oregon Department of Forestry dispatched two pumper engines and 12 overhead personnel to the fire. During the day, the fire spread to the northeast and began burning the west face of Dog Mountain. At that time, the fire was reported to be . In the afternoon, the blaze jumped a fire line and spread northeast toward Drew's Reservoir. As a result, an evacuation notice was issued for residents living along south side of the reservoir. However, the wind shifted driving the fire to the south, up the east slope of Dog Mountain.
 The fires continued to burn actively on 10 August, fire managers requested an overhead support team from National Incident Management Organization to assist in planning and oversight of fire operations. During the day, northerly winds pushed the fire to the south and southeast.
 Between 11 August and 13 August, the prevailing wind direction shifted a number of times. During the day it generally blew from the west and southwest. At night, the winds were predominantly from the northeast and east, which is very unusual for south central Oregon. As a result, the fire continued to spread to the south. On 11 August, the fire covered  with over 1,100 firefighters battling the flames. On 12 August, the fire continued to burn very actively.

 By 14 August, the fire was burning intensely on private timberland west of Lakeview. The extreme fire conditions were also threatening approximately 200 structures including residences in the small unincorporated community of Westside. To help protect these structures the number of firefighters had grown to 1,404.
 From 15 August and 17 August, the fire continued to spread further south. Firefighters saved the Crowder Flat Guard Station and Willow Creek Ranch by building fire lines around the structures. Evacuation orders remained in place for the Westside community, the area southeast of Drew's Reservoir, and property west of Goose Lake. Additional evacuations occurred south of the Oregon border. The fire continued to grow as gusty and erratic winds arrived with a new storm on 17 August. However, the storm also brought light precipitation in some areas. By the end of 17 August, the fire had consumed , but it was only 30 percent contained.
 On 18 August and 19 August, fire conditions continued to moderate with reduced wind and cooler temperatures.  This allowed firefighters to make good progress toward containing the fire. Crews continued to build and strengthen containment lines while mop up operations began in some area.  Forest Service tree fallers began cutting hazardous snag trees along the fire line at the north end of the burn.  Most evacuations orders were lifted on 19 August.

 From 20 August and 26 August, the fire continued to burn inside fire lines, but did not grow beyond established lines. On 20 August, there were still 1,256 personnel working on the fire. The southeast front of the fire remained active during the day with individual trees continued to torch off in some interior area. At the end of the day, the total acreage burned was estimated to be . On 24 August,  fire managers announced that the Barry Point Fire was 90 percent contained with 775 firefighters still working on the fire. The next day, the fire was 95 percent contained and the number of personnel on scene had been reduced to 632.
 On 27 August, interagency fire management team announced that the fire was 100 percent contained. A large number of firefighters remained on scene to conduct mop up operations. All the remaining evacuation orders were lifted in both Oregon and California, but residents were warned that smoke would persist in the area until all the fuel inside the fire line had finished burning. Forest Service recreation sites, roads, and trails remained closed due to fire mop up activities.
 From 28 August to 17 September, the fire continued to creep and smolder inside the fire line.  As of 29 August, 465 firefighters continued to support mop up operations.  This included both Forest Service and Oregon Department of Forestry units.  Crews worked on repairing fences, culverts, and other infrastructure damaged by fire suppression activities.  Ground crews also burned out interior areas with heavy brush that were within  of the perimeter lines.  These operations continued for several more weeks as the fire smoldered and crept through unburned islands inside the fire line.  By 7 September, there were only 33 firefighters left on scene.  The final fire report for the Barry Point Fire was issued on 17 September, highlighting the fact the last crew had left the fire scene.

Fire area 

The Forest Service originally reported the final size of the fire to be . Most of the burned area was Federal land. However, forest lands belonging to the State of Oregon, and various private owners were also burned. The burned acreage identified in the preliminary fire report was as follows:

 Fromont National Forest, 
 Modoc National Forest, 
 Non‐ Federal Oregon lands, 
 Non‐ Federal California lands, 

Approximately  of commercial timber was consumed by the fire with a 75 percent tree mortality. An addition  of forest was seriously damaged.

During the course of the Barry Point Fires, there were 3 structures destroyed and 3 firefighters injured.  According to the Forest Service, the total cost of the fire suppression effort was over $23.2 million.

Post-fire activity 

Forest restoration began immediately after the fire was contained.  The Fremont-Winema and Modoc national forests appointed a joint Burned Area Emergency Rehabilitation Team to oversee forest restoration activities.  Under the team's supervision, Forest Service and Oregon Department of Forestry crews cleared roads, mended fences, repaired culverts, and rehabilitated bulldozer trails.

Timber salvage operations began shortly after the fire suppression ended.  The Forest Service worked with the Collins Timber Company and the Fremont sawmill in Lakeview to remove dead trees that were still marketable.  However, the salvage process was not an easy one.  In September 2012, the Fremont-Winema National Forest offered to sell 25 million board feet of salvage timber to Collins.  This was because Collins operated the only sawmill in Lakeview, the nearest mill to the salvage area.  However, Collins declined to buy the Forest Service timber, choosing instead to focus on salvaging its own burned timber first.  Then in December 2012, the Forest Service offered its salvage timber in a sale open to all bidders, but there were no interested parties. This was due to concerns about the quality of the damaged timber and the distance it would have to be transported.  Finally, the Forest Service broke the timber sale into smaller lots near existing roads.  By then, Collins had removed much of its burned timber so they acquired some of the Forest Service salvage timber.  Ultimately, the Forest Service only salvaged about 9 percent of the timber burned by the Barry Point Fire.

After salvage logging and clearing burned areas, the Forest Service began replanting trees in the Barry Point burn. An additional  was replanted in 2015.

The project included a $2.5 million grant for wildlife habitat restoration from the conservation groups. In exchange for the grant, Collins and another timber company agreed to offer a conservation easement across  of private land, including approximately  unburned forest and meadow lands in northern California. The conservation project will restore habitat for numerous resident and migratory species that are native to northeastern California. Species include mule deer, pronghorn, Rocky Mountain elk, American black bear, and cougar along with bird species such as black-backed woodpeckers, great grey owls, sandhill cranes, goshawks, and bald eagles. Native redband trout will also benefit from the restoration project.

Images

References

External links 

United States Forest Service, Barry Fire Documentation
Fremont-Winema National Forest

2012 in Oregon
2012 California wildfires
Fremont–Winema National Forest
Lake County, Oregon
Modoc National Forest
Wildfires in Modoc County, California
Wildfires in Oregon